The following is a list of notable events and releases of the year 2007 in Norwegian music.

Events

January
 17 – The 2nd Ice Music Festival Festival started in Geilo (January 17–19).
 22 – The 20th Nordlysfestivalen started in Tromsø (January 22 – 28).

February
 1 – The 10th Polarjazz Festival started in Longyearbyen (February 1 – 4).
 8 – Kristiansund Opera Festival opened (February 8 – 24).

March
 30
 The 34th Vossajazz started at Voss (March 30 – April 1).
 Snorre Bjerck was awarded Vossajazzprisen 2007.
 31 – Berit Opheim performs the commissioned work Ein engel går stilt for Vossajazz 2007.

April
 26 –  Bergenfest started in Bergen (April 26 – May 1).

May
 23
The start of Bergen International Music Festival Festspillene i Bergen (May 23 – June 6).
 The 35th Nattjazz started in Bergen (May 23 – June 2).

June
 14 – Norwegian Wood started in Oslo (June 14 – 17).

July
 4 – The 43nd Kongsberg Jazzfestival started in Kongsberg (July 4 – 7).
 16
 The 47th Moldejazz started in Molde (July 16 – 21).
 Arve Henriksen received the Radka Toneff Memorial Award at Moldejazz opening concert.

August 
 8 – The 21st Sildajazz started in Haugesund (August 8 – 12).
 13 – The 22nd Oslo Jazzfestival started in Oslo (August 13 – 19).
 29 – The 3rd Punktfestivalen started in Kristiansand (August 29 – September 1).
 31 – The 4th Ekkofestival started in Bergen (August 31 – September 1).

September 
 13 – The DølaJazz started in Lillehammer (September 13 – 16).
 28 – The 29th Ultima Oslo Contemporary Music Festival opened in Oslo (September 28 – Oktober 14).

October 
 11 – The 6th Insomnia Festival started in Tromsø (October 11 – 13).
 31 – The Oslo World Music Festival started in Oslo (October 31 – November 4).

November 
 1 – The 2nd Barents Jazz, Tromsø International Jazz Festival started (November 1 – 3).

December 
 11 – The Nobel Peace Prize Concert was held at Telenor Arena.

Albums released

January

August

Unknown date

A
 Eivind Aarset
 Sonic Codex (Jazzland Recordings)

Deaths

July
 12 — Robert Burås, guitarist for Madrugada and My Midnight Creeps (born 1975).

September
 5 — Thomas Hansen, Norwegian musician known as "Saint Thomas", combination of prescribed drugs (born 1976).

November
 16 — Grethe Kausland, actress and singer, lung cancer (born 1947).

See also
 2007 in Norway
 Music of Norway
 Norway in the Eurovision Song Contest 2007

References

 
Norwegian music
Norwegian
Music
2000s in Norwegian music